The nine sons of the dragon are Chinese dragons who are the mythological sons of the Dragon King. There are many variations in the different descriptions of the nine sons, including in basic facts like their names, but all versions state that there are nine.

History 

The oldest known attestation of the children of the dragon list is found in the Shuyuan Zaji (Miscellaneous records from the bean garden) by Lu Rong (1436–1494); however, he noted that the list enumerates mere synonyms of various antiques, not children of a dragon.

Several Ming Dynasty texts list what were claimed as the Nine Offspring of the Dragon, and subsequently these feature prominently in popular Chinese stories and writings. , quoting  Xie Zhaozhe (1567–1624) in his work Wuzazu gives the following listing in order of oldest to youngest:

A well-known work of the end of the sixteenth century, the Wuzazu, informs us about the nine different young of the dragon, whose shapes are used as ornaments according to their nature.
The qiúniú , (Form of dragon)  a creature that likes music, are used to adorn musical instruments.
The yázì , (Hybrid of wolf and dragon) a creature that likes to fight, is aggressive and is normally found on cross-guards on sword as ornaments.
The cháofēng , (Resemble a Phoenix and dragon) a creature that likes to adventure. They are typically placed on the four corners of roofs.
The púláo , (Four leg small form dragon class)  a creature that likes to scream, and are represented on the tops of bells, used as handles.
The suānní , (Hybrid of lion and dragon) a creature that likes to sit down, are represented upon the bases of Buddhist idols (under the Buddhas' or Bodhisattvas' feet).
The bìxì , also known as bàxià  (Hybrid of turtle and dragon) a creature with a large shell able to carry heavy objects, and are normally found on under grave-monuments.
The bì'àn , (Hybrid of tiger and dragon) a creature that likes litigation, are placed over prison gates (in order to keep guard).
The bāxià , (Hybrid of reptilia animal and dragon) a creature that likes to drink water, and is typically used on bridge structures.
The chīwěn , (Hybrid of fish and dragon)  a creature that likes swallowing, are placed on both ends of the ridgepoles of roofs (to swallow all evil influences).

Further, the same author enumerates nine other kinds of dragons, which used as ornamental decoration or as part of classical Chinese architecture. These examples can be found architecture throughout Asia used for adorning key-holes, on roofing, incense burners, door knockers, bridges, etc.

The Sheng'an waiji collection by the poet Yang Shen (1488–1559) gives different 5th and 9th names for the dragon's nine children: the tāo tiè, form of beasts, which loves to eat and is found on food-related wares, and the jiāo tú, which looks like a conch or clam, does not like to be disturbed, and is used on the front door or the doorstep. Yang's list is bìxì, chīwěn or cháofēng, púláo, bì'àn, tāotiè, qiúniú, yázì, suānní, and jiāotú. In addition, there are some sayings including xìxì; which have the shape of the chīhǔ ( One kind small form dragon), and are fond of literature, are represented on the sides of grave-monuments.

Modern names 
The 9 sons of the dragon were recognized by the Chinese government's official Shanghai Mint in 2012's year of the Dragon by issuing 2 sets of coins, one in silver and one in brass. Each coin in the 9 coin sets depicts one of the 9 sons. A 10th additional coin was issued depicting the father dragon in silver and brass, which has iconography of the 9 sons on the reverse, for a total of 20 coins in the series. The coins are certified by NGC with the following names:

 Bi'an
 Bixi
 Chaofeng
 Chiwen
 Fuxi (The real name is Xixi)
 Pulao
 Qiuniu
 Suanni
 Yazi

Number nine 
The number nine is special in China as it is the largest possible single digit, and Chinese dragons are frequently connected with it. For example, a Chinese dragon is normally described in terms of nine attributes and usually has 117 (9×13) scales, 81 (9×9) Yang and 36 (9×4) Yin. This is also why there are nine forms of the dragon and there are 9 sons of the dragon. The Nine-Dragon Wall is a spirit wall with images of nine different dragons, and is found in imperial Chinese palaces and gardens. Because nine was considered the number of the emperor, only the most senior officials were allowed to wear nine dragons on their robes — and then only with the robe completely covered with surcoats. Lower-ranking officials had eight or five dragons on their robes, again covered with surcoats; even the emperor himself wore his dragon robe with one of its nine dragons hidden from view.

There are many places in China with the phrase "Nine Dragons" in their name, the most famous being Kowloon (in Cantonese) in Hong Kong. The part of the Mekong in Vietnam is known as Cửu Long, with the same meaning.

See also 
 Chi (mythology)
 Chinese dragon
 Chinese mythology
 Chinese gods
 Dragon King
 King of the Gods
 List of deities
 Denglong (mythology)

References

Citations

Bibliography

External links 

 The Nine Dragon Scroll | Dragon History | The Circle of the Dragon
 Legends of the 9 Sons of the Dragon
 The Lascivious Dragon and Its Nine Sons with Pictures | MildChina.com 
 The 9 Sons of the Dragon on Vimeo

Chinese architectural history
Chinese iconography
Chinese dragons
Chinese sculpture
9 Sons Of The Dragon
National personifications